Popioły may refer to:
 , by Stefan Żeromski
 Popioły (film), a 1965 Polish film
 Popioły, Kuyavian-Pomeranian Voivodeship, a former village in Poland
 Popioły, Warmian-Masurian Voivodeship, a village in Poland